Killhope is a small settlement at the very highest end of Weardale in County Durham, England. Killhope Pass, the road linking Killhope, County Durham to Nenthead, Cumbria, reaches 627m (2057 feet) above sea level. This makes it the highest paved public A road in the UK.

The village is home of the North of England Lead Mining Museum which is based at the old Park Head Mine.

References

Hamlets in County Durham
Stanhope, County Durham